CIBN may refer to:

Chartered Institute of Bankers of Nigeria, professional organization for bankers in Nigeria
China International Broadcasting Network, Chinese media company